Aleksandr Shalak (born 1980) is a Belarusian cross-country skier. He represented Belarus at the 2002 Winter Olympics in Salt Lake City, where he competed in 15 km, 50 km and sprint.

References

1980 births
Living people
Belarusian male cross-country skiers
Cross-country skiers at the 2002 Winter Olympics
Olympic cross-country skiers of Belarus